Sour Grapes is a 1998 American black comedy film written and directed by Larry David and starring Steven Weber, Craig Bierko, Viola Harris, Karen Sillas, and Matt Keeslar. It was released on April 17, 1998, by Columbia Pictures.

Plot
Richie Maxwell is down to his last quarter at a slot machine in Atlantic City, so he asks cousin Evan for two more coins for one more spin — a spin that wins a $400,000 jackpot.

The joy of victory is quickly replaced by a fierce disagreement over who deserves what. Richie begins by offering Evan a very small percentage of his winnings. Evan didn't expect anything at first but now he is offended because he provided two-thirds of the money Richie sank into the machine.

A bitter feud develops. Richie, a sneaker designer, hogs all the money and quits his job. Evan, a doctor, is so annoyed that, as a prank, he lets Richie believe he is dying. By the time he reveals the joke, Richie has done something drastic.

The more rattled Evan gets, the more distracted he becomes at work. And even when the cousins come to a tentative truce, everything backfires on them in events that involve girlfriends, relatives and even the homeless.

In the end, Ritchie loses all his money and winds up right back where he started. Despondent, he goes home to perform oral sex on himself—a pastime of his.

Cast

Production
It was shot during mid-1997, after Larry David had left Seinfeld. Locations used include New York, Long Beach, California and Atlantic City, New Jersey.

Reception
The film gained poor reviews from critics. The film made it on the 2000 list of Roger Ebert's most hated films, remarking in his review that, "I can't easily remember a film I've enjoyed less." He criticized its mean-spirited nature, saying "Sour Grapes is a comedy about things that aren't funny [...] Larry David, who wrote and directed Sour Grapes, apparently thinks people are amused by cancer, accidental castration, racial stereotypes and bitter family feuds."  The film has a 27% rating on Rotten Tomatoes from 15 reviews.

Larry David himself has expressed regrets over the film. A poster for the film was put up on the set of David's office for the filming of Curb Your Enthusiasm's pilot episode. David had the poster promptly removed because he got "sick of looking at it" after one show. In a later episode, David's character tells his wife to stop lending people the film, and says he doesn't believe a friend who claimed to have enjoyed the movie, stating she was just trying to be polite.

References

External links
 
 

1998 films
1990s black comedy films
1990s buddy comedy films
1990s screwball comedy films
American buddy comedy films
American black comedy films
American screwball comedy films
Castle Rock Entertainment films
Columbia Pictures films
1990s English-language films
Films directed by Larry David
Films set in New Jersey
Films shot in Atlantic City, New Jersey
Films with screenplays by Larry David
1998 comedy films
1998 directorial debut films
1990s American films